Downstairs at the King's Head is a comedy club located in Crouch End, London, England, opened in 1981.

Peter Grahame and Huw Thomas set up the venue to create an alternative comedy scene in north London. The club has a capacity of 100 people. Comedians to have appeared at the club include Rob Beckett, Nina Conti, Phil Wang and Ivo Graham.

References 

Comedy clubs in the United Kingdom
Crouch End
Entertainment venues in London
1981 establishments in the United Kingdom
Event venues established in 1981